Qutoutiao is a Chinese mobile content aggregator.

History
The company was founded in 2016, and is based in Shanghai. In English, the name translates to "fun headlines."

Chinese billionaire Eric Tan is the chairman and co-founder.

The company is backed by Tencent Holdings.

By September 2018, it had around 17.1 million daily active users on its app, with monthly active users totaling 48.8 million.

Following an IPO and Nasdaq listing in September 2018, the company's stock price rose 128%, and with a valuation of over US$1 billion, it became a so-called unicorn company.

Products
According to TechCrunch, the app "uses an AI-based content recommendation engine to display articles and videos based on user profiles."

References

External links

Chinese companies established in 2016
Companies listed on the Nasdaq
2016 establishments in China
Companies based in Shanghai
2018 initial public offerings